Roger Bootle-Wilbraham, 7th Baron Skelmersdale (2 April 1945 – 31 October 2018), was a British politician and Conservative member of the House of Lords.

He was educated at Eton College.

From 1972, Lord Skelmersdale and his wife Christine owned and operated Broadleigh Gardens, a horticultural centre at Barr House, Bishops Hull, Taunton, Somerset.

Lord Skelmersdale succeeded to the peerage in 1973 on the death of his father Lionel Bootle-Wilbraham, 6th Baron Skelmersdale. He was made a House of Lords whip in Margaret Thatcher's government in 1981, holding that position until 1986. He then moved to the Department of Environment as a Parliamentary Under Secretary of State and then to the Department of Health and Social Security in 1987 before that department was split in 1988.

Lord Skelmersdale continued at the Department of Social Security until 1989 when he was assigned to the Northern Ireland Office, serving until the end of Thatcher's premiership in November 1990. He was not reappointed by John Major.

With the passage of the House of Lords Act 1999, Lord Skelmersdale, along with almost all other hereditary peers, lost his automatic right to sit in the House of Lords. He was however elected as one of the ninety-two elected hereditary peers to remain in the House of Lords pending completion of House of Lords reform.

Lord Skelmersdale was, as of 2006, a Conservative Shadow Minister for the Department for Work and Pensions as a member of David Cameron's front bench team, however, he did not become a minister in the coalition Cameron ministry starting in 2010.

He served as a Deputy Chairman of Committees from 1991 to 2003 (and Deputy Speaker from 1995), and again from 2010 to 2014.

Lord Skelmersdale was a bridge player and a member of the all-party parliamentary bridge group.

Lord Skelmersdale died on 31 October 2018 at the age of 73.

References

External links
 Parliament profile
 TheyWorkForYou profile

1945 births
2018 deaths
People educated at Eton College
Skelmersdale, Roger Bootle-Wilbraham, 7th Baron
Eldest sons of British hereditary barons
Skelmersdale, Roger Bootle-Wilbraham, 7th Baron
Northern Ireland Office junior ministers
Hereditary peers elected under the House of Lords Act 1999